The 1978 Detroit Tigers finished in fifth place in the American League East with a record of 86-76, 13½ games behind the Yankees. They outscored their opponents 714 to 653. 

It was the franchise's first winning season since 1973 and would start a string of winning seasons that would not come to an end until 1989.

Offseason 
 January 10, 1978: Chris Codiroli was drafted by the Tigers in the 1st round (11th pick) of the 1978 Major League Baseball draft.
 January 30, 1978: Tito Fuentes was purchased from the Tigers by the Montreal Expos.

Regular season 
The Tigers drew 1,714,893 fans to Tiger Stadium in 1978, ranking 5th of the 14 teams in the American League.

Season standings

Record vs. opponents

Notable transactions 
 June 6, 1978: 1978 Major League Baseball draft
Kirk Gibson was drafted by the Tigers in the 1st round (12th pick).
Jerry Ujdur was drafted by the Tigers in the 4th round.

Roster

Player stats

Batting

Starters by position 
Note: Pos = Position; G = Games played; AB = At bats; H = Hits; Avg. = Batting average; HR = Home runs; RBI = Runs batted in

Other batters 
Note: G = Games played; AB = At bats; H = Hits; Avg. = Batting average; HR = Home runs; RBI = Runs batted in

Pitching

Starting pitchers 
Note: G = Games; IP = Innings pitched; W = Wins; L = Losses; ERA = Earned run average; SO = Strikeouts

Other pitchers 
Note: G = Games; IP = Innings pitched; W = Wins; L = Losses; ERA = Earned run average; SO = Strikeouts

Relief pitchers 
Note: G = Games pitched; W = Wins; L = Losses; SV = Saves; GF = Games finished; ERA = Earned run average; SO = Strikeouts

Awards and honors 
Lou Whitaker
 AL Rookie of the Year Award

Ron LeFlore
 Tiger of the Year Award, from Detroit baseball writers

All-Stars 
Jason Thompson, reserve

League top ten finishers 
Steve Kemp
 #3 in AL in bases on balls (97)
 #4 in AL in times on base (259)
 #5 in AL in games played (159)

Ron LeFlore
 MLB leader in runs scored (126)
 AL leader in stolen bases (68)
 AL leader in singles (153)
 #2 in AL in hits (198)
 #2 in AL in runs created (105)
 #2 in MLB in at bats (666)
 #2 in MLB in plate appearances (741)
 #3 in MLB in times on base (267)
 #3 in AL in outs (501)
 #4 in AL in Power/Speed Number (20.4)
 #5 in AL in times caught stealing (16)

Dave Rozema
 #5 in MLB in bases on balls per 9 innings pitched (1.76)

Jim Slaton
 #4 in AL in hit batsmen (8)
 #5 in AL in wild pitches (10)

Rusty Staub
 #2 in MLB in RBIs (121)
 #2 in MLB in games played (162)
 #2 in AL in sacrifice flies (11)
 #2 in AL in at bats per strikeout (18.3)
 #2 in AL in outs (505)
 #3 in AL in at bats (642)
 #3 in MLB in plate appearances (734)
 #3 in MLB in times grounded into double plays (24)
 #4 in AL total bases (279)
 #5 in AL in hits (175)
 #5 in AL in times on base (254)

Jason Thompson
 #4 in AL in runs created (104)
 #5 in AL in total bases (278)

Milt Wilcox
 #4 in AL in hit batsmen (8)

Players ranking among top 100 all time at position 
The following members of the 1979 Detroit Tigers are among the Top 100 of all time at their position, as ranked by The Bill James Historical Baseball Abstract in 2001:
 Lance Parrish: 19th best catcher of all time (played 12 games as a rookie)
 Lou Whitaker: 13th best second baseman of all time (played 11 games as a rookie)
 Alan Trammell: 9th best shortstop of all time (played 19 games as a rookie)
 Aurelio Rodríguez: 91st best third baseman of all time
 Ron LeFlore: 80th best center fielder of all time

Farm system

References

External links 
 1978 Detroit Tigers Regular Season Statistics

Detroit Tigers seasons
Detroit Tigers season
Detroit Tiger
1978 in Detroit